The Germany men's national under-18 ice hockey team is the men's national under-18 ice hockey team of Germany. The team is controlled by the German Ice Hockey Federation, a member of the International Ice Hockey Federation. The team represents Germany at the IIHF World U18 Championships.

International competitions

IIHF European U18/U19 Championships
  

1968: Forfeited qualification games
1969: 5th place
1970: 5th place
1971: 5th place
1972: 5th place
1973: 6th place
1974: 1st in Group B
1975: 6th place
1976: 5th place
1977: 6th place
1978: 7th place
1979: 7th place
1980: 5th place
1981: 7th place
1982: 6th place
1983: 5th place

1984: 5th place
1985: 6th place
1986: 5th place
1987: 8th place
1988: 1st in Group B
1989: 5th place
1990: 7th place
1991: 5th place
1992: 5th place
1993: 6th place
1994: 6th place
1995:  2nd place
1996: 6th place
1997: 8th place
1998: 1st in Group B

IIHF World U18 Championships

1999: 9th place
2000: 7th place
2001: 5th place
2002: 10th place
2003: 2nd in Division I Group A
2004: 1st in Division I Group B
2005: 8th place
2006: 8th place
2007: 8th place
2008: 5th place
2009: 10th place
2010: 1st in Division I Group B

2011: 6th place
2012: 6th place
2013: 8th place
2014: 9th place
2015: 10th place
2016: 2nd in Division I Group A
2017: 5th in Division I Group A
2018: 2nd in Division I Group A
2019: 1st in Division I Group A
2020: Cancelled due to the COVID-19 pandemic
2021: 10th place

External links
Germany at IIHF.com

juniors
National under-18 ice hockey teams